"On conducting a special military operation" was a televised broadcast by Russian president Vladimir Putin on 24 February 2022, immediately preceding the Russian invasion of Ukraine, which greatly escalated the Russo-Ukrainian War. 

It addressed the citizens of Russia and Ukraine, as well as the Russian Armed Forces and the Armed Forces of Ukraine. In this second explanation speech, Putin intended to sway public opinion by describing the nature of Russia's war as a "special military operation". In addition to the larger motivations and goals behind his escalation of hostile rhetoric towards Ukraine. To justify the invasion, Putin falsely claimed that Ukraine had developed into a neo-Nazi state with Russophobic policies; he invoked Article 51 of the United Nations Charter, stating that Russia was mobilizing to defend the Donetsk People's Republic and the Luhansk People's Republic (two pro-Russia, non-UN separatist states in Ukraine) from Ukrainian neo-Nazism. Addressing NATO, he characterized the Russian military presence in Ukraine as a necessary security measure, and described NATO's post-1991 expansion as an indicator that the United States never truly sought to normalize relations with Russia after the Cold War.

Address 
On 24 February 2022, at 5:30 a.m. Moscow Time, state television channels began broadcasting a new address by Russian president Vladimir Putin. In this speech, he talked about the following points:

NATO-backed Ukraine as an "Anti-Russia" state 
In his speech, Putin spoke about the impossibility of reaching an agreement with NATO on equal terms and accused the military alliance of expanding to the east. Putin mentioned the enlargement of NATO frequently in his address, calling it "unacceptable", along with the military development of Ukraine. He said: "As NATO expands to the east, with every passing year, the situation for our country is getting worse and more dangerous. Moreover, in recent days the leadership of NATO has been openly talking about the need to speed up, and force the advancement of the alliance's infrastructure to the borders of Russia. In other words, they are doubling down on their position. We can no longer just watch what is happening. It would be absolutely irresponsible on our part."

Putin stated that Ukraine was becoming an "anti-Russia" state, with it being supplied by other NATO members with "the most modern weapons", saying: "Further expansion of the NATO infrastructure and the beginning of military development in Ukraine's territories are unacceptable for us. The problem, of course, is not NATO itself – it is only an instrument of US foreign policy. The problem is that in the territories adjacent to us – territories that were historically ours, I emphasise – an 'anti-Russia' hostile to us is being created, placed under full external control; [it] is intensively settled by the armed forces of NATO countries and is supplied with the most modern weapons."

Announcement of a "special military operation" in Ukraine's Donbas 
Putin later announced the start of a "special military operation" in the Donbas region, citing Article 51 of the UN Charter, the decision of the Federation Council on the use of Russian troops in Ukraine and agreements with the Donetsk People's Republic (DPR) and Luhansk People's Republic (LPR). He said:

Update and recognition of Donbas separatist states  
Days earlier, on 21 February, Russia officially recognised the DPR and the LPR as independent states, which were agreements with the DNR and LNR referred to by Putin. They were ratified by the State Duma and the Federation Council. He said the purpose of the "operation" was to "protect the people" in the predominantly Russian-speaking region of Donbas who, according to Putin, "for eight years now, have been facing humiliation and genocide perpetrated by the Kyiv regime". Putin said that "all responsibility for possible bloodshed will be entirely on the conscience of the regime ruling on the territory of Ukraine". Putin also stated that Russia sought the "demilitarization and denazification" of Ukraine.

Call to the Ukrainian people 
Putin called on the Ukrainian military to "immediately lay down their arms and go home", saying: "All servicemen of the Ukrainian army who comply with this requirement will be able to freely leave the combat zone and return to their families. All responsibility for possible bloodshed will be entirely on the conscience of the ruling regime on the territory of Ukraine." Addressing the citizens of Ukraine, he linked Russia's actions with self-defense against the threats created for it and "an even greater disaster than the one that is happening today", saying: "No matter how hard it is, I ask you to understand this and call for interaction in order to turn this tragic page and move forward together."

Putin stated there were no plans to occupy Ukrainian territory and that he supported the right of the peoples of Ukraine to self-determination, saying: "Our plans do not include the occupation of Ukrainian territories. We are not going to impose anything on anyone by force. At the same time, we hear that recently in the West there is talk that the documents signed by the Soviet totalitarian regime, securing the outcome of World War II, should no longer be upheld. Well, what is the answer to this?"

"The outcome of World War II, as well as the sacrifices made by our people on the altar of victory over Nazism, are sacred."

Warning against international intervention 
At the end of the address, Putin warned other countries against intervening in the conflict, saying:

Aftermath and expansion of the "special military operation" to all of Ukraine
Putin's address was aired during an emergency meeting of the UN Security Council on the situation in Ukraine that began on the evening of 23 February. At the meeting itself, Vasily Nebenzya, Russia's representative to the UN, stated: "We are not carrying out aggression against the Ukrainian people, but against the group that seized power in Kyiv."

Within minutes of Putin's announcement, explosions were reported in Kyiv, Kharkiv, Odessa, and the Donbas. At about 5 am. Kyiv time, the Russian Aerospace Forces and Russian Navy launched missile and bomb attacks on Ukrainian military facilities. Simultaneously, the Russian Ground Forces entered the territory of Ukraine from several directions, including from the occupied Crimea and from the territory of Belarus, beginning the 2022 Russian invasion of Ukraine.

On 20 July 2022, The New York Times reported that Lavrov announced that Russia would respond to the increased military aid being received by Ukraine from abroad as justifying the expansion of the 'special operations' front to include military objectives in both the Zaporizhzhia and Kherson regions.

Russian arguments for invasion

Expansion of NATO since the fall of the Soviet Union 

After the dissolution of the USSR, 14 new countries were admitted to NATO, with four of them sharing a common border with Russia. Ukraine was presented with the prospect of joining NATO in 2008; since then, the process has stalled. During his visit to Russia in mid-February 2022, German Chancellor Olaf Scholz confirmed this status in the foreseeable future. The logistics infrastructure and airfields suitable for strengthening Russian troops were created after the annexation of Crimea by the Russian Federation in 2014. Of particular concern to Russia was the deployment of missile defense systems in Poland. The missile defense system makes it possible to intercept short and medium-range ballistic missiles, but Russia has refused to discuss the control of these weapons.

Article 51 of the UN Charter to militarily aid Donetsk PR and Luhansk PR 
Putin's reference to Article 51 of the UN Charter is regarded by a number of lawyers as incorrect.  John B. Bellinger III, member of the Council on Foreign Relations, believes that the reference to requests for help from the supposedly sovereign DPR and LPR, neither of which are UN members, does not allow Russia to use Article 51 of the UN Charter, since this article allows one UN member state to protect another member state. Swiss researcher of international law Nico Krisch argues that Article 51 is the right to self-defense in exceptional cases, mainly when an attack on a country has already been committed or is about to begin. For other situations, there is the UN Security Council and other conflict resolution mechanisms; the blurred threat that Putin sees as NATO cannot justify military action. Krisch recalled that in the early 2000s, when the United States tried to introduce the concept of "preventive self-defense" as justification for the use of military force, most countries opposed such an interpretation, and Russia was among them. Putin's reference to Article 51 of the UN Charter was also rejected by the Organization for Security and Co-operation in Europe and UN Secretary-General António Guterres.

Claims about Ukrainian neo-Nazism and genocide of Russians in Ukraine 

As justification for the invasion of Ukraine, Putin used the image of Ukraine as a neo-Nazi state; according to historians, he exploited genocide and the memories of World War II. Putin's accusations against Ukraine of committing genocide in the Donbas have been dismissed as baseless by the U.S. On 24 February, Putin called the "denazification" of Ukraine one of the goals of the invasion and stated that "neo-Nazis seized power in Ukraine". At a meeting of the Security Council of Russia on 25 February, he called the Ukrainian authorities "a gang of drug addicts and neo-Nazis".

UN Secretary-General António Guterres refused to consider the events in Donbas a genocide. He stated that "genocide is a crime that has a clear definition and should be used in accordance with international law. I think this is not the case." German Chancellor Olaf Scholz called Putin's statement about the genocide "ridiculous". The genocide in Donbas allegation was also rejected by the chairman of the UNESCO Commission on the Prevention of Genocide Alexander Laban Hinton, and political scientist and expert on ultra-right movements Andreas Umland.

The world's leading scholars of the history of World War II, the Holocaust, genocide, and Nazism (Jared McBride, Francine Hirsch, Timothy D. Snyder, Omer Bartov, Christoph Diekman, and others) published a statement in The Jewish Journal of Greater Los Angeles weekly newspaper pointing out the incorrectness of the rhetoric about neo-Nazism and signed by almost 150 historians. The Jewish Journal says that the authors do not intend to idealize the Ukrainian state and society, mentioning certain elements of xenophobia, but nonetheless writes that "There is no Nazi government for Moscow to root out in Kyiv. There has been no genocide of the Russian people in Ukraine. And Russian troops are not on a liberation mission. After the bloody 20th century, we should all have built enough discernment to know that war is not peace, slavery is not freedom, and ignorance offers strength only to autocratic megalomaniacs who seek to exploit it for their personal agendas". The Washington Post commented that "the rhetoric of the fight against fascism resonates deeply in Russia, which suffered huge losses in the fight against Nazi Germany in World War II".

The far-right nationalist parties failed to win a single seat in the 450-seat Verkhovna Rada. Since 2015, the law "On condemnation of the communist and national-socialist (Nazi) totalitarian regimes in Ukraine and the prohibition of propaganda of their symbols" (Law No. 317-VIII) has been in force on the territory of Ukraine, and there are examples of bringing neo-Nazis to criminal liability. Analysts say Putin greatly exaggerated the scale of the issue, and there is no widespread support for this ideology in the government, military, or electorate.

Separate criticism of Putin's intention to "denazify" the country came from Ukrainian President Volodymyr Zelenskyy, who is himself Jewish and has family members and relatives who were victims of the Holocaust. Umland comments that the Russian-speaking Zelenskyy won the 2019 Ukrainian presidential election by a wide margin, while his opponent was a Ukrainian-speaker. Ulrich B. Schmid, professor of Russian culture and society studies at the University of St. Gallen in Switzerland, called Putin's words a "despicable insinuation", and he said that there are no fewer far-right groups in Russia itself than in Ukraine.

The Auschwitz-Birkenau State Museum issued a strong protest against Putin's accusations of neo-Nazism. The United States Holocaust Memorial Museum noted that the Jewish population of Ukraine suffered greatly in World War II, being almost completely destroyed by Nazi Germany, and expressed support for the Ukrainian people, including thousands of people who survived the Holocaust, and called accusations of alleged genocide in Ukraine "groundless and blatant".

Threat of nuclear warfare 
Josep Borrell, the EU representative for foreign affairs and security policy, as well as Brookings Institution senior fellow Michael E. O'Hanlon and Associated Press vice president John Daniszewski, assessed Putin's words about a possible response to intervention in the conflict as a threat to use nuclear weapons.

On 27 February, Putin ordered the Minister of Defense to put the strategic deterrence forces into a special mode of combat duty. The reason for this was what he called the "unfriendly actions" of Western countries in the economic sphere, as well as the "aggressive statements" of their leaders.

International condemnation 

NATO Secretary-General Jens Stoltenberg issued a statement condemning "Russia's reckless and unprovoked attack on Ukraine, which puts at risk countless civilian lives. Once again, despite our repeated warnings and tireless efforts to engage in diplomacy, Russia has chosen the path of aggression against a sovereign and independent country."

US president Joe Biden issued a statement saying that Russia had launched "an unprovoked and unjustified attack" on the Ukrainian people.

In the statement, Biden said: "President Putin has chosen a premeditated war that will bring a catastrophic loss of life and human suffering." He said: "Russia alone is responsible for the death and destruction this attack will bring, and the United States and its Allies and partners will respond in a united and decisive way. The world will hold Russia accountable."

As news of the announcement broke, UN Secretary-General Guterres asked Putin to halt the invasion: "President Putin, stop your troops from attacking Ukraine. Give peace a chance, too many people have already died."

See also 

 "Address concerning the events in Ukraine", a televised address by Putin on 21 February 2022
 "On the Historical Unity of Russians and Ukrainians", a 2021 essay by Putin
 "Where have you been for eight years?", a phrase used during the 2022 Russian invasion of Ukraine
 "What Russia Should Do with Ukraine", a 2022 op-ed article written by Timofey Sergeytsev and published by Russian state-owned news outlet RIA Novosti
 Russian irredentism
 Pobedobesie

Notes

References 

2022 speeches
Articles containing video clips
Declarations of war
February 2022 events in Russia
Nazi analogies
Opposition to NATO
Prelude to the 2022 Russian invasion of Ukraine
Propaganda in Russia related to the 2022 Russian invasion of Ukraine
Speeches by Vladimir Putin